The 1994 NAIA Division I women's basketball tournament was the tournament held by the NAIA to determine the national champion of women's college basketball among its Division I members in the United States and Canada for the 1993–94 basketball season.

Top-seeded Southern Nazarene defeated David Lipscomb in the championship game, 97–74, to claim the Redskins' second NAIA national title. This would ultimately be the first of four consecutive championships for Southern Nazarene. 

The tournament was played at the Oman Arena in Jackson, Tennessee.

Qualification

The tournament field remained fixed at thirty-two teams, with the top sixteen teams receiving seeds. 

The tournament continued to utilize a simple single-elimination format.

Bracket

See also
1994 NAIA Division I men's basketball tournament
1994 NCAA Division I women's basketball tournament
1994 NCAA Division II women's basketball tournament
1994 NCAA Division III women's basketball tournament
1994 NAIA Division II women's basketball tournament

References

NAIA
NAIA Women's Basketball Championships
1994 in sports in Tennessee